Ruaraidh Murray (born in 18 September 1975) is a Scottish actor, writer and a comedian.

Early life

Murray was born in Edinburgh, Scotland to Fiona (née Grant) and Graeme Murray. Raised in Stockbridge, Edinburgh, he was educated at Stockbridge Primary School and Broughton High School before studying drama at the Oxford School of Drama. Murray was also a member of the Traverse Theatre and Royal Court Theatre’s Young Writer's Group.

Career

Acting

Murray's acting career began at the age of 10 when he starred opposite John Hannah, Stratford Johns and James Cosmo in the Channel 4 TV series, Brond, directed by Michael Caton-Jones. His character was murdered after being pushed off the Gibson Street Bridge in Glasgow.

Murray's Theatre roles include playing Tommy in the 2006 No. 1 UK Tour of Irvine Welsh’s Trainspotting performing in such theatres as King's Theatre, Edinburgh, Dundee Repertory Theatre, His Majesty's Theatre, Aberdeen, Grand Opera House, Belfast, Sherman Theatre Cardiff, Birmingham Repertory Theatre, The Lowry Manchester, Oxford Playhouse, Leicester Haymarket Theatre, Theatre Royal, Bath and the Hackney Empire London. Murray played the role of Nicky in Time Out London's Critics Choice play Disintegration at the award-winning Union Theatre, London, he played the role of Scott in Time Out London's Critics Choice play We’re All Doing also at the Union Theatre, London, he played Magadus in award-winning Tom Kempinski’s play High Jumpers at the New End Theatre, Award-winning King's Head Theatre's play Lord Arthur's Bed playing Jim and playing Adam Kruger in F*cked.com at the award-winning Traverse Theatre.

In 2016, Murray became the face of Paddy Power in the widely circulated Scotland's 2016 Euro Anthem spot directed by Academy Award Nominated Peter Cattaneo. Murray's other commercial work includes working with Coca Cola, McDonald's, Evian, Wrigley's Big Red, Fanta, Vodafone, BT Cellnet, Ikea, Boots, Party Poker and Old Speckled Hen.

In 2017, Murray played the role of the narrator in the Codemasters video game Dirt 4. Murray's Video Game voice work also includes Ubisoft's Magic & Magic Heroes VII playing hero Bart Brimstone.

Actor/writer

In 2014, Diana Rigg saw Boxman at the Edinburgh Festival Fringe and awarded Murray with her top festival prize. Murray performed Big Sean, Mikey and Me and Bath Time live at Soho Radio London in 2015. Murray is known for writing dark comedies incorporating strong Scottish themes, with Allie being Murray's first drama. He played a fishmonger in the 2020 movie "Then Came You".

Critical acclaim

Alex Eades said in his 4-star The List review of Murray's play The Club starring Murray and English actor Mark Farrelly, "The performances are magnetic, sparking a wonderful chemistry in this exhilarating and utterly intoxicating razor-sharp dark comedy."

Nick Awde's 4-star review in The Stage of The Club said, “There’s a huge amount of promise in this one-acter and you can see this effortlessly expanded to TV.”

The Stages Thom Dibdin wrote in his review of Big Sean, Mikey and Me, "MUST SEE! Murray illuminates the psyche of Scottish youth culture."

Metros Damon Smith wrote in his 4-star review of Big Sean, Mikey and Me, "Murray's bravura performance goes from the sublime to the ridiculous in his impressive one-man show."

The Herald's theatre critic Neil Cooper's 4-star review of Bath Time said, "It's a bleak and brutal picture that Murray paints, but this exquisitely constructed little firecracker of a show is possessed with an energy and a common touch that makes it irresistible."

BBC critic Robert Jackman's 5-star review of Irvine Welsh's play Trainspotting said of Murray's performance, "Welsh's wit is transferred perfectly to stage as Renton and Tommy's blend of horror and humour reaches almost schizophrenic level. However, the self-denial and delusion of Ruaraidh Murray's Tommy makes his decline even more harrowing."

References

External links

1975 births
Living people
21st-century Scottish male actors
Scottish male child actors
Scottish male film actors
Scottish male television actors
Place of birth missing (living people)